English is the only compulsory subject for the award of the Higher School Certificate at the end of secondary schooling in New South Wales, Australia. Marks gained in at least two units of English must also be included in the calculation of the Australian Tertiary Admission Rank (ATAR) used to determine entry to university. Students must study one of the following courses:
 English (Advanced)
 English (Standard)
 English as a Second Language (ESL)
 English Studies (formerly not an ATAR course)

Optional courses include:
 English Extension 1
 English Extension 2
 Fundamentals of English (discontinued in 2018)

Modules
The Area of Study is a common module between English (Advanced) and English (Standard). It involves examining how a selection of prescribed texts provided by the NSW Board of Studies, and other related materials chosen by the student, portray and represent specific themes and ideas (e.g. "Belonging" and "Discovery").

English (Advanced) and English (Standard) also consists of their own three modules of study in addition to the Area of Study:
 Module A - Experience Through Contexts (Standard) / Comparative Study of Texts and Contexts (Advanced)
 Module B - Close Study of Text (Standard) / Critical Study of Text (Advanced)
 Module C - Texts and Society (Standard) / Representation and Text (Advanced)

As of the updated 2018 syllabus, the Area of Study has been replaced with the common module Texts and Human Experiences for English (Advanced), English (Standard) and English Studies. The modules of English (Advanced) and English (Standard) have also been replaced:
 Module A - Language, Identity and Culture (Standard) / Textual Conversations (Advanced)
 Module B remains unchanged aside from new prescribed texts.
 Module C has been changed into a Creative Writing module: The Craft of Writing. Both Advanced and Standard students study this module, but their prescribed texts for basis and analysis are different.

English Extension 1

The English Extension 1 course is for candidates that wish to undergo further study of English in their Higher School Certificate. The English (Advanced) course and Preliminary English Extension course are a prerequisite.

There are three modules in the English Extension 1 course, each with separate electives. Candidates study one elective, choosing three prescribed texts to study. The course is divided into three separate elective studies, with students studying a single module within these elective units:

1.) Genre Study (Life Writing, Comedy, or Science Fiction)

2.) Texts and Ways of Thinking (After the Bomb, Romanticism, Navigating the Global)

3.) Language and Values (Textual Dynamics, Language and Gender)

As of the 2018 syllabus, Extension 1 now only consists of one common module, Literary Worlds, with five separate electives with their own subjects of study and sets of prescribed texts.

English Extension 2

The English Extension 2 course is for candidates that wish to undergo further study of English in their Higher School Certificate. Both the English (Advanced) and English Extension 1 courses are a prerequisite.

Students submit a Major Work that may either be under the print medium (short story/ies, poems, critical response, scripts - radio, television, film and drama), the sound medium (speeches, radio drama, performance poetry), or the visual medium (video, multimedia). Candidates write a 1500-word Reflection Statement to accompany their Major Work.

The Major Work is marked internally as a process and draft, and externally as a product. Unlike the English Advanced and English Extension 1 courses, there is no HSC exam for English Extension 2, with the final HSC mark determined solely by the external marking of the Major Work.

Examinations
English Paper 1 is a one-hour and thirty-minutes examination (plus 10 minutes reading time) usually conducted on the first day of the HSC exams. The paper is common to both English (Standard) and English (Advanced) students and is thus the most widely sat HSC exam. English Paper 1 tests the Area of Study through two questions:
 Question 1 (15 marks/40 minutes)): unseen texts - requires students to deconstruct and analyse a number of unseen texts of a variety of forms. There are a number of short questions (1-2 marks), building up to a longer answer (approx 6 marks).
 Question 2 (15 marks/40 minutes): extended response. Students usually answer on their core text, one text from the Board of Studies stimulus booklet (no longer used) and one or more texts of their own choice. It is usually written in essay form.

English Paper 2 is a two-hour examination (plus 5 minutes reading time) usually conducted on the second day of the HSC exams. The paper is different between English (Standard) and English (Advanced). The response form of these questions may be specified or liberal but is normally in essay form, although other forms may occasionally be appropriate. English Paper 2 tests the English Modules through three questions, on the individual modules (A, B and C), all worth 20 marks with 40 minutes recommended writing time.

English Extension 1 has a two-hour examination (plus 5 minutes reading time). Students answer two questions relating to the module or elective they have studied, each marked out of 25 and allocated approximately one hour of writing.

English Extension 2 has no examination but students submit a Major Work at the end of the course.

References

HSC English syllabus (contains English Standard, Advanced, Extension 1, Extension 2, English as a Second Language and English Fundamentals course outlines)

External links 
 HSC English Research Guide - State Library of New South Wales
  (contains the updated 2018 syllabuses and outlines for the HSC English courses from NESA)

Education in New South Wales